The Cumberland sheepdog is an extinct dog breed related to the border collie and other old working collie types.  It is claimed to be one of the ancestors of the Australian shepherd and in the early part of the 20th century some Cumberland sheepdogs were being referred to as border collies and may have been absorbed into the latter breed.

History 

Cumberland sheepdogs were described in Dogs In Britain, A Description of All Native Breeds and Most Foreign Breeds in Britain by Clifford LB Hubbard, 1948.

Conformation 

Hubbard described the breed as much like the Welsh sheepdog and old working collie types.  It worked quietly, quickly and low-to-ground. The head was rather broad and flat, tapering to a medium-length muzzle.  The ears fell over to the front or were semi-erect and rather small. The body was fairly long and extremely lithe, with light but muscular legs and a low-set tail carried at the trail. The coat was fairly heavy and quite dense.  Cumberland sheepdogs were black with white blaze, chest, feet and tip of tail. Height was about 20 inches and weight ranged 40–50 pounds.

See also
 List of dog breeds
 List of extinct dog breeds

References 

 Hubbard, Clifford LB.  1948.  Dogs In Britain, A Description of All Native Breeds and Most Foreign Breeds in Britain.
 3 Cumberland Sheepdogs (photo)
 History of the Australian Shepherd
 Breeds From A Common Root

Extinct dog breeds
Herding dogs
Dog breeds originating in England